The 1879–80 season was the ninth season of competitive football in England.

International matches

* England score given first

Note – TheFa.com  gives different times for the England goals in the match against Wales.

Honours

Notes = Number in parentheses is the times that club has won that honour. * indicates new record for competition

References

External links